Dobrets is a rural locality (a village) in Zheleznodorozhnoye Rural Settlement, Sheksninsky District, Vologda Oblast, Russia. The population was 72 as of 2002.

Geography 
Dobrets is located 15 km southwest of Sheksna (the district's administrative centre) by road. Krasny Kholm is the nearest rural locality.

References 

Rural localities in Sheksninsky District